Sojas Rud may refer to:
 Sojas Rud District
 Sojas Rud Rural District